Did You Know People Can Fly? is the first full-length album by Kaddisfly. It was released in 2003 under a self-titled independent record label. In interviews about the album, the group's musicians commented that they were trying to a new style to stay fresh and differentiate themselves from their prior works.

Production
Did You Know People Can Fly? is the first full-length album by Kaddisfly. The album was released December 12, 2003, under the label Kaddisfly. Aaron Tollefson, a musician who played guitar on the album, commented about the writing of the music, "when it came to writing this record, we wanted to wipe away everything people knew of us and resurface with a composition that couldn't be boxed, labeled, or formulaically packaged." Beau Kuther, a fellow member of the group who contributed percussive talent to the album, observed, "We wanted to really challenge ourselves and write a record where every noise, texture, and color fit into the composition on a whole." Kile Brewer, who contributed bass on the piece, emphasized the importance of the group's music staying original, "We are all of the same mind that if we are going to exist in this business for life, we will have to perpetually challenge ourselves, take risks, and never create the same record twice. The moment you grow static is the moment your music needs eyes." One of the songs from the album, "Midnight In Shanghai", was featured on the compilation album "Take Action! Vol 4", released in 2004.

Track listing

Personnel
Christopher Ruff – vocals, piano
Aaron Tollefson – guitars
Beau Kuther – drums, percussion
Kile Brewer – bass, vocals

See also

Alternative rock
Caddisfly
Experimental rock
Four Seasons EP
Set Sail the Prairie
Timeline of progressive rock

References

Further reading

External links

Did You Know People Can Fly?, CDBaby

2003 debut albums